The North Midlands Football League is an Australian rules football leagues based in Mid West (Western Australia).  

The league was formed in 1921 as the North Midlands Football Association.  The five founding teams were Three Springs, Carnamah, Arrino, Mingenew (not the current Mingenew club) and Yandanooka.

In 1926, Mingenew and Yandanooka merged to form Mingenew-Yandanooka.  That club only lasted two seasons, and folded at the end of the 1927 season.

The league remained a four-club competition when Coorow joined in 1928.  The league then remained unchanged until it went into recess in 1941 due to World War II.

The League recommenced in 1946 with the same four clubs, and continued until the end of the 1959 season.  In 1960, the League was joined by two new clubs, Mingenew Rovers and Mingenew Wanderers, who were both playing in the Irwin Districts Football League until it disbanded at the end of the 1959 season.  The two Mingenew clubs merged into the Mingenew club in 1961, which is the same Mingenew club playing today.

In 1963, the League reduced back to four teams when Arrino were no longer able to field a side.

In 1964, the nearby Perenjori-Morawa Football Association disbanded, and the six clubs from that competition merged into three new clubs and joined the North Midlands Football League.  Morawa and Koolanooka merged to form Morawa (Tigers), Merkanooka and Gutha merged to form Morawa Rovers, and Caron and Perenjori merged to form Perenjori.  The competition also changed name to the North Midlands Football League at that time.

Morawa Rovers disbanded at the end of the 1966 season, and its players were absorbed by Morawa (Tigers).

In 1968, Latham became the seventh club in the League, after joining from the disbanded Dalwallinu and Districts Football Association that went into recess at the end of 1967.

In 1971, the League returned to six teams following the merger of Coorow and Latham to form Coorow-Latham.

In 1981, Dongara joined from the Coastal Football Association.  Dongara left the League in 1995 to join the Great Northern Football League, but re-joined from the 2000 season.

There are currently six clubs in the league coming from Dongara in the North, Perenjori in the East and Coorow in the South. The league's season consists of fifteen minor rounds and then a finals series based on the McIntyre system.

Current clubs

Former clubs

Grand final results 

{| class="wikitable"
!Year || Premiers || Score || Runners up || Score
|-
| 1921 || Yandanooka ||  || ? || 
|-
| 1922 || Carnamah ||  || Arrino || 
|-
| 1923 || Arrino || 3.9 (27) || Three Springs || 3.7 (25)
|-
| 1924 || Arrino || 4.11 (35) || Yandanooka || 4.4 (28)
|-
| 1925 || Arrino || 6.3 (39) || Three Springs || 3.6 (24)
|-
| 1926 || Arrino || 3.6 (24) || Carnamah || 3.4 (22)
|-
| 1927 || Arrino || 7.9 (51) || Carnamah || 5.7 (37)
|-
| 1928 || Arrino || 8.4 (52) || Three Springs || 4.6 (30)
|-
| 1929 || Three Springs || 9.12 (66) || Arrino || 5.7 (37)
|-
| 1930 || Carnamah || 4.4 (28) || Three Springs || 3.3 (21)
|-
| 1931 || Arrino || 13.14 (92) || Carnamah || 4.8 (32)
|-
| 1932 || Carnamah || 11.12 (78) || Arrino || 6.9 (45)
|-
| 1933 || Carnamah || 6.13 (49) || Arrino || 6.6 (42)
|-
| 1934 || Carnamah || 7.10 (52) || Arrino || 4.12 (36)
|-
| 1935 || Three Springs || 11.13 (79) || Carnamah || 8.11 (59)
|-
| 1936 || Carnamah || 5.7 (37) || Arrino || 4.9 (33)
|-
| 1937 || Arrino || 13.18 (96) || Coorow || 7.9 (51)
|-
| 1938 || Arrino || 10.12 (72) || Three Springs || 6.5 (41)
|-
| 1939 || Carnamah || 11.7 (73) || Three Springs || 8.9 (57)
|-
| 1940 || Coorow || 6.7 (43) || Arrino || 5.9 (39)
|-
| 1946 || Arrino || 9.10 (64) || Coorow || 6.8 (44)
|-
| 1947 || Coorow || 11.15 (81) || Three Springs || 8.9 (57)
|-
| 1948 || Three Springs || 8.10 (58) || Arrino || 6.3 (39)
|-
| 1949 || Three Springs || 12.16 (88) || Coorow || 4.8 (32)
|-
| 1950 || Coorow || 11.13 (79) || Carnamah || 6.6 (42)
|-
| 1951 || Carnamah || 10.7 (67) || Coorow || 7.19 (61)
|-
| 1952 || Coorow || 11.13 (79) || Carnamah || 7.10 (52)
|-
| 1953 || Three Springs  || 15.13 (103)16.20 (116) || Carnamah || 16.7 (103)13.11 (89)
|-
| 1954 || Arrino || 7.6 (48) || Three Springs || 7.5 (47)
|-
| 1955 || Three Springs || 9.7 (61) || Carnamah || 6.8 (44)
|-
| 1956 || Coorow || 11.13 (79) || Carnamah || 8.8 (56)
|-
| 1957 || Three Springs || 17.9 (111) || Carnamah || 6.7 (43)
|-
| 1958 || Carnamah || 23.15 (153) || Three Springs || 7.8 (50)
|-
| 1959 || Coorow || 11.14 (80) || Carnamah || 10.3 (63)
|-
| 1960 || Carnamah || 8.18 (66) || Coorow || 4.14 (38)
|-
| 1961 || Carnamah || 11.16 (82) || Coorow || 9.10 (64)
|-
| 1962 || Carnamah || 13.17 (95) || Three Springs || 9.10 (64)
|-
| 1963 || Three Springs || 13.8 (86) || Carnamah || 11.15 (81)
|-
| 1964 || Mingenew || 12.7 (79) || Morawa Rovers || 11.7 (73)
|-
| 1965 || Coorow || 12.9 (81) || Morawa Rovers || 8.5 (53)
|-
| 1966 || Morawa Rovers || 8.12 (60) || Perenjori || 4.10 (34)
|-
| 1967 || Morawa || 14.16 (100) || Coorow || 9.9 (63)
|-
| 1968 || Perenjori || 3.7 (25) || Three Springs || 3.6 (24)
|-
| 1969 || Morawa || 11.18 (84) || Three Springs || 11.11 (77)
|-
| 1970 || Carnamah || 13.8 (86) || Three Springs || 7.12 (54)
|-
| 1971 || Three Springs || 16.7 (103) || Coorow-Latham || 5.9 (39)
|-
| 1972 || Coorow-Latham || 8.8 (56) || Carnamah || 6.10 (46)
|-
| 1973 || Carnamah || 13.6 (84) || Coorow-Latham || 8.14 (62)
|-
| 1974 || Three Springs  || 21.8 (134) || Coorow-Latham || 14.9 (93)
|-
| 1975 || Coorow-Latham || 14.21 (105) || Three Springs || 9.10 (64)
|-
| 1976 || Coorow-Latham || 13.12 (90) || Mingenew || 8.13 (61)
|-
| 1977 || Three Springs || 12.15 (87) || Coorow-Latham || 8.16 (64)
|-
| 1978 || Morawa || 20.16 (136) || Three Springs || 19.14 (128)
|-
| 1979 || Mingenew || 15.9 (99) || Morawa || 4.28 (52)
|-
| 1980 || Morawa || 14.14 (98) || Three Springs || 9.11 (65)
|-
| 1981 || Morawa || 22.13 (145) || Three Springs || 13.12 (90)
|-
| 1982 || Coorow-Latham || 23.19 (157) || Perenjori || 9.12 (66)
|-
| 1983 || Mingenew || 11.14 (80) || Coorow-Latham || 8.8 (56)
|-
| 1984 || Morawa || 15.15 (105) || Perenjori || 8.12 (60)
|-
| 1985 || Morawa || 9.24 (78)17.25 (127) || Three Springs || 11.12 (78)5.12 (42)
|-
| 1986 || Coorow-Latham || 11.13 (79) || Carnamah || 7.12 (54)
|-
| 1987 || Morawa || 20.11 (131) || Carnamah || 9.19 (73)
|-
| 1988 || Morawa || 22.12 (144) || Mingenew || 12.12 (84)
|-
| 1989 || Mingenew || 16.12 (108) || Dongara || 13.15 (93)
|-
| 1990 || Dongara || 15.10 (100) || Three Springs || 11.2 (68)
|-
| 1991 || Dongara || 10.18 (78) || Three Springs || 4.4 (28)
|-
| 1992 || Three Springs || 14.14 (98) || Morawa || 6.10 (46)
|-
| 1993 || Coorow-Latham || 16.13 (109) || Morawa || 8.10 (58)
|-
| 1994 || Dongara || 16.9 (105) || Coorow-Latham || 11.14 (80)
|-
| 1995 || Coorow-Latham || 12.16 (88) || Morawa || 10.8 (68)
|-
| 1996 || Morawa || 17.15 (117) || Three Springs || 12.1 (73)
|-
| 1997 || Mingenew || 13.20 (98) || Coorow-Latham || 12.6 (78)
|-
| 1998 || Mingenew || 13.11 (89) || Coorow-Latham || 11.9 (75)
|-
| 1999 || Three Springs || 15.14 (104) || Mingenew || 5.12 (42)
|-
| 2000 || Three Springs || 27.10 (172) || Coorow-Latham || 2.11 (23)
|-
| 2001 || Mingenew || 17.7 (109) || Coorow-Latham || 12.13 (85)
|-
| 2002 || Mingenew || 14.15 (99) || Three Springs || 8.7 (55)
|-
| 2003 || Mingenew || 16.12 (108) || Carnamah-Perenjori || 11.8 (74)
|-
| 2004 || Carnamah-Perenjori || 16.17 (113) || Mingenew || 8.3 (51)
|-
| 2005 || Three Springs || 16.5 (101) || Mingenew || 13.19 (97)
|-
| 2006 || Coorow-Latham || 12.15 (87) || Dongara || 8.7 (55)
|-
| 2007 || Mingenew || 12.18 (90) || Coorow-Latham || 6.7 (43)
|-
| 2008 || Dongara || 22.16 (148) || Three Springs || 13.10 (88)
|-
| 2009 || Mingenew  || 14.12 (96) || Coorow-Latham  || 5.6 (36)
|-
| 2010 || Mingenew || 12.9 (81) || Dongara || 10.11 (71)
|-
| 2011 || Morawa || 11.14 (80) || Mingenew || 8.12 (60)
|-
| 2012 || Carnamah-Perenjori || 9.16 (70) || Mingenew || 8.12 (60)
|-
| 2013 || Mingenew || 15.12 (102) || Morawa || 11.3 (69)
|-
| 2014 || Mingenew || 23.13 (151) || Dongara || 9.7 (61)
|-
| 2015 || Mingenew || 14.10 (94) || Three Springs || 8.8 (56)
|-
| 2016 || Dongara || 20.8 (128) || Mingenew || 5.6 (36)
|-
| 2017 || Mingenew || 8.12 (60) || Coorow-Latham || 8.6 (54)
|-
| 2018 || Morawa || 11.14 (80) || Three Springs || 9.7 (61)
|-
| 2019 || Dongara || 12.12 (84) || Morawa || 9.8 (62)
|-
| 2020 || Morawa || 12.18 (90) || Mingenew || 10.6 (66)
|-
| 2022 || Coorow-Latham || 16.10 (106) || Carnamah/Perenjori 8.12 (60)

Ladders

2002 ladder

2003 ladder

2004 ladder

2005 ladder

2006 ladder

2007 ladder

2008 ladder

2009 ladder

2010 ladder

2011 ladder

2012 ladder

2013 ladder

2014 ladder

2015 ladder

2016 ladder

2017 ladder

References

 A Way of Life - The Story of country football in Western Australia - Alan East

Australian rules football competitions in Western Australia